Dobrý anjel (translated from Slovak as Good Angel) is a non-profit charitable organization founded by Igor Brossmann and Andrej Kiska in 2006. This organization tries to help families with children that are in a difficult financial situation due to a serious disease (such as cancer) of its member. The donors, called good angels, donate regularly any amount of money they want to and can check how their money is being spent by seeing the recipient and the amount that was donated.

Up to 19 March 2014, more than 140,000 people have donated €  to this organization.

References

External links
Official Website

2006 establishments in Slovakia
Peer-to-peer charities
Children's charities based in Slovakia